Dmitri Ivanovich Butaliy (born 23 June 1976) is a former Russian football player.

His father Ivan Butaliy is a football coach.

References

1976 births
Living people
Russian footballers
FC KAMAZ Naberezhnye Chelny players
Russian Premier League players
Place of birth missing (living people)

Association football defenders